Muhammad Ajmal Asif is a Pakistani politician who was a Member of the Provincial Assembly of the Punjab, from February 2008 to May 2018 and then from August 2018 till January 2023.

Early life
He was born on March 25th, 1970.

Political career
He was elected to the Provincial Assembly of the Punjab as a candidate of Pakistan Muslim League (Q) from Constituency PP-63 (Faisalabad-XIII) in 2008 Pakistani general election. He received 29,413 votes and defeated a candidate of Pakistan Peoples Party.

He was re-elected to the Provincial Assembly of the Punjab as a candidate of Pakistan Muslim League (N) (PML-N) from Constituency PP-63 (Faisalabad-XIII) in 2013 Pakistani general election.

He was re-elected to Provincial Assembly of the Punjab as a candidate of PML-N from Constituency PP-108 (Faisalabad-XII) in 2018 Pakistani general election.

References

Living people
Punjab MPAs 2013–2018
1976 births
Pakistan Muslim League (N) MPAs (Punjab)
Punjab MPAs 2008–2013
Punjab MPAs 2018–2023